The 2019 Meath Senior Football Championship is the 127th edition of the Meath GAA's premier club Gaelic football tournament for senior clubs in County Meath, Ireland. 18 teams compete, with the winner representing Meath in the Leinster Senior Club Football Championship. The championship starts with a group stage and then progresses to a knock out stage.

St. Peter's Dunboyne were the defending champions after they defeated Summerhill in the 2018 final to claim their third S.F.C. crown. However, the defence of their title was disappointing, failing to proceed past the group stages. 

This was Longwood's return to the top flight for the first time in 76 years after claiming the 2018 Meath Intermediate Football Championship. Longwood last won the I.F.C. in 1942 and after spending one season in the senior grade in 1943, they were regraded to the J.F.C. for 1944.

Longwood, Rathkenny and St. Patrick's were relegated back to the I.F.C. for 2020 after spending just one, 13 and 19 seasons respectively in the top-flight of Meath club football when losing a relegation play-off.

On 27 October 2019, Ratoath claimed their first ever S.F.C. title after just four years as a senior club when defeating Summerhill 3-15 to 2-13 in the final at Pairc Tailteann. Ciarán Ó Fearraigh became the first Ratoath captain to lift the Keegan Cup while Joey Wallace claimed the "Man-of-the-Match" award for his performance. The match was refereed by David Gough. 

The draw for the group stages of the championship were made on 4 March 2019 with the games commencing on 4 April 2019.

Championship Structure Change Proposals
In 2019:

 3 teams shall be relegated from the S.F.C. to the I.F.C. in 2019. The 2019 I.F.C. champions will be promoted to S.F.C. for 2020.
 Relegation from the S.F.C. shall be decided as follows - the teams that finish in fifth and sixth places in each Group A, B, and C each play one relegation game. The loser of each game will be relegated to the I.F.C. for 2020. 
 The draw for the Relegation play-offs will be pre-determined as follows - A5 -vs- B6; B5 -vs- C6; C5 -vs- A6. 

 In the event of a relegation game finishing level, extra-time will be played and if still level then the game will go to a replay.

In 2020:
 The S.F.C. shall contain 16 teams drawn in rotation into four groups each containing four teams. The top two teams shall progress to the quarter-finals, the bottom two in each group shall contest the relegation quarter-finals.

Team Changes
The following teams have changed division since the 2018 championship season.

To S.F.C.
Promoted from I.F.C.
 Longwood  -  (Intermediate Champions)

From S.F.C.
Relegated to I.F.C.
 Blackhall Gaels

Participating teams
The teams taking part in the 2019 Meath Senior Football Championship are:

Group stage 

There are three groups of six teams called Group A, B and C. The 1st and 2nd placed teams in Groups A, B and C along with the 3rd placed team in Group A automatically qualify for the quarter-finals. The third placed teams in Groups B and C engage in the Preliminary Quarter-Final to determine the team that completes the quarter-finals lineup.
The 5th and 6th placed teams will proceed to the Relegation Play-Off to determine which three teams will suffer relegation.

The draw for the group stages of the championship were made on 4 March 2019 with the games commencing on 4 April 2019.

Tiebreakers:
If two or more teams were equal on points on completion of the group matches, the following tie-breaking criteria would be applied:

All Football Championships and Leagues shall be run on a combination of a league and knockout basis under Rule 6.21 T.O. Where teams finish equal with points for qualification or relegation process for concluding stages, the positioning shall be decided as follows;

 (i) Where three teams are involved - the outcome of the meetings of the three teams in their previous games in the competition. If three teams finish level on points for three places and one team has beaten the other two teams that team qualifies in first place and other places are determined by the specified order. If there are two positions and one team has beaten the other two teams that team qualifies and the second place is determined by the specified order. If there is one position and one team has beaten the other two team that team qualifies;
 (ii) Where two teams are involved - the outcome of the meeting of the two teams in the previous game in the competition;
 (iii) Scoring Difference;
 (iv) Highest total scores for;
 (v) A play-off.

Group A

Skryne ranked ahead of Dunshaughlin and Navan O'Mahony's due to head-to-head results against the three sides. 

Dunshaughlin are ranked ahead of Navan O'Mahony's as they won the head-to-head game between the two teams.

Round 1
 Gaeil Colmcille 1-11, 0-13 Dunshaughlin, Skryne, 4/4/2019,

 Skryne 0-12, 0-9 St. Patricks, Duleek, 6/4/2019,

 Navan O'Mahonys 2-11, 1-11 Seneschalstown, Walterstown, 6/4/2019,

Round 2
 Skryne 3-13, 2-13 Navan O'Mahonys, Simonstown, 20/4/2019,

 Gaeil Colmcille 2-14, 1-10 St. Patrick's, Rathkenny, 21/4/2019,  

 Dunshaughlin 3-11, 2-13 Seneschalstown, Ashbourne, 21/4/2019, 

Round 3
 Seneschalstown 2-15, 2-11 Skryne, Pairc Tailteann, 09/8/2019,  

 Dunshaughlin 2-13, 0-11 St. Patrick's, Ashbourne, 10/8/2019,  

 Navan O'Mahonys 1-11, 0-11 Gaeil Colmcille, Ballinlough, 14/8/2019,  

Round 4
 Seneschalstown 5-14, 0-10 St. Patrick's, Donore, 23/8/2019,  

 Gaeil Colmcille 3-18, 0-5 Skryne, Pairc Tailteann, 24/8/2019,  

 Dunshaughlin 2-12, 1-9 Navan O'Mahonys, Ratoath, 24/8/2019  

Round 5
 Gaeil Colmcille 8-9, 2-11 Seneschalstown, Drumconrath, 8/9/2019
 Navan O'Mahonys 1-11, 0-13 St. Patrick's, Donore, 8/9/2019
 Skryne 2-12, 2-7 Dunshaughlin, Trim, 8/9/2019

Group B

Head-to-head results could not separate Summerhill, Ratoath and Donaghmore/Ashbourne, so each team's score difference came into effect.

Round 1
 Moynalvey 3-12, 0-9 Rathkenny, Skryne, 6/4/2019,

 Ratoath 7-16, Longwood 0-11, Trim, 7/4/2019,

 Donaghmore/Ashbourne 1-15, 1-10 Summerhill, Dunshaughlin, 7/4/2019,

Round 2
 Rathkenny 1-14, 2-9 Longwood, Pairc Tailteann, 20/4/2019,

 Ratoath 0-11, 0-8 Donaghmore/Ashbourne, Pairc Tailteann, 20/4/2019,

 Summerhill 1-14, 1-9 Moynalvey, Trim, 20/4/2019,

Round 3
 Donaghmore/Ashbourne 3-15, 0-11 Rathkenny, Duleek, 9/8/2019,  

 Summerhill 1-10, 1-9 Ratoath, Pairc Tailteann, 11/8/2019,  

 Moynalvey 2-16, 1-6 Longwood, Summerhill, 13/8/2019,  

Round 4
 Summerhill 4-19, 1-11 Rathkenny, Pairc Tailteann, 24/8/2019,  

 Ratoath 2-12, 1-10 Moynalvey, Skryne, 25/8/2019,  

 Donaghmore/Ashbourne 6-21, 2-11 Longwood, Walterstown, 25/8/2019,

Round 5
 Donaghmore/Ashbourne 0-7, 0-6 Moynalvey, Skryne, 7/9/2019
 Ratoath 1-16, 0-9 Rathkenny, Seneschalstown, 7/9/2019
 Summerhill 4-23, 0-8 Longwood, Clonard, 7/9/2019

Group C

Na Fianna are ranked above Curraha due to the head-to-head result between the two teams.

Round 1
 St. Peter's Dunboyne 1-16, 0-14 Curraha, Ratoath, 6/4/2019,

 Na Fianna 3-9, 0-14 St. Colmcille's, Trim, 7/4/2019,

 Simonstown Gaels 2-8, 1-9 Wolfe Tones, Brews Hill, 12/4/2019, 

Round 2
 Wolfe Tones 0-13, 0-11 St. Peter's Dunboyne, Skryne, 18/4/2019, 

 Simonstown Gaels 0-14, 0-13 St. Colmcille's, Ashbourne, 18/4/2019, 

 Na Fianna 2-15, 3-11 Curraha, Dunsany, 20/4/2019, 

Round 3
 Wolfe Tones 2-15, 1-13 St. Colmcille's, Stamullen, 11/8/2019,  

 Curraha 0-12, 0-7 Simonstown Gaels, Skryne, 11/8/2019,  

 St. Peter's Dunboyne 2-12, 1-11 Na Fianna, Pairc Tailteann, 11/8/2019,  

Round 4
 Simonstown Gaels 3-22, 1-10 Na Fianna, Trim, 25/8/2019,

 Curraha 1-19, 1-7 Wolfe Tones, Pairc Tailteann, 25/8/2019,  

 St. Peter's Dunboyne 0-15, 1-12 St. Colmcille's, Stamullen, 25/8/2019,  

Round 5
 Simonstown 1-14, 0-10 St. Peter's Dunboyne, Dunshaughlin, 8/9/2019
 Curraha 2-21, 1-11 St. Colmcille's, Stamullen, 8/9/2019
 Na Fianna 0-18, 0-14 Wolfe Tones, Páirc Tailteann, 8/9/2019

Knock-Out Stage

The 1st and 2nd placed teams in Groups A, B and C along with the 3rd placed team in Group A automatically qualify for the quarter-finals. The third placed teams in Groups B and C engage in the Preliminary Quarter-Final to determine the team that completes the quarter-finals lineup.

Preliminary Quarter-Final

Quarter-finals

Semi-finals

Final

Relegation play-off
Due to the 2019 modifications of the club football structure in Meath ratified by the Co. Board in early January 2019, this season 3 clubs shall be relegated to the 2020 Meath I.F.C. in order to leave 16 clubs competing for the 2020 Meath S.F.C.

The Relegation Play-Off will consist of the 5th and 6th placed finishers in Groups A, B and C. The three winners shall retain their senior status while the three losers shall be relegated to the Intermediate championship.

Leinster Senior Club Football Championship

Quarter Final:
Garrycastle 3-11 Ratoath 2-12, Cusack Park, 10/11/2019

References

External links

Meath Senior Football Championship
Meath Senior Football Championship
Meath SFC